is an adventure game for the Nintendo 3DS. It was co-developed by Konami and Winkysoft, and designed by Zone of the Enders director Noriaki Okamura. The game is set in late 19th-century Paris, and follows the eponymous protagonist, archaeologist Doctor Lautrec, on his quest for a hidden treasure of the Bourbon dynasty.

Gameplay
Doctor Lautrec and the Forgotten Knights is played on the Nintendo 3DS. The game progresses as the player navigates the environment, puts together clues, and solves puzzles.

Plot
Doctor Lautrec and the Forgotten Knights takes place in Paris at the end of the 19th century, during the Belle Époque. The protagonist of the game, the eccentric and mystery-solving archaeologist Doctor Jean-Pierre Lautrec, is a lecturer at the city's Museum of Natural History. Together with his assistant Sophie Coubertin, a university student, he comes into possession of a map that leads to a hidden treasure of Louis XIV of France. On their quest through Paris and the catacombs beneath it, Doctor Lautrec and Sophie are pursued by a crime syndicate and the Knights of the Iron Mask, an order of knights with iron masks and claws.

Development
Doctor Lautrec and the Forgotten Knights was designed, written, directed and produced by Zone of the Enders director Noriaki Okamura. It was co-developed by Konami and Winkysoft, and marked Okamura's first experience with the stereoscopic three-dimensional graphics of the Nintendo 3DS handheld console. The game shares many aesthetic, and story similarities to Level-5's Professor Layton series of adventure games, and Okamura said he is inspired by that series.

Reception
The game was met with mixed reception. The UK Official Nintendo Magazine stated that the game had a lot of work put into it, but in general, slowly falls into repetition, with them giving it score of 69%. They also noted its overt similarities to the Professor Layton series, and often referred to the game as a flagrant rip-off of the aforementioned franchise that is clearly intended to "cash-in" on its success.

References

External links
 

2011 video games
Adventure games
Konami games
Nintendo 3DS games
Nintendo 3DS-only games
Puzzle video games
Video games set in Paris
Video games set in the 19th century
Winkysoft games
Video games developed in Japan
Single-player video games